Diamond Days is the third album by Out of the Grey, released on March 1, 1994. This is the first of two albums that were more Adult Contemporary. The style appealed to contemporary Christian music radio formats with several singles.

Track listing

Personnel 

 Christine Dente – vocals
 Scott Dente – vocals, acoustic guitar, electric guitars (6, 10)
 Jerry McPherson – electric guitars
 Charlie Peacock – keyboards (1–4, 6–10), Wurlitzer electric piano (5)
 Tommy Sims – bass (1, 2, 5, 6, 7, 10), keyboards (4, 7, 8, 9)
 Mark Hill – bass (3)
 Jimmie Lee Sloas – bass (4, 8, 9)
 Steve Brewster – drums
 Mark Hammond – percussion (1, 2, 5, 8)
 Eric Darken – percussion (3, 4, 7, 9, 10)
 Carl Marsh – orchestration (5), strings (7, 9)
 Bob Mason – cello (7)
 Conni Ellisor – violin (7)

Production
 Charlie Peacock – producer at The Gardens, Bellevue, Tennessee – recording studio
 Peter York – executive producer
 Tom Laune – engineer, mixing (5, 6, 8, 9, 10)
 Kevin B. Hipp – assistant engineer
 Shane Wilson – assistant engineer
 Rick Will – mixing (1–4, 7)
 Pete Martinez – mix assistant (1–4, 7)
 Ken Love – mastering at MasterMix, Nashville, Tennessee 
 Karen Philpott – art direction, design
 R.J. Lyons – design
 East-West Design Group – design
 Mark Tucker – photography
 Andi Ashworth – budget administration 
 Robyn Lynch – hair, make-up 
 Debrae Little – stylist 

Studios
 Battery Studios, Nashville, Tennessee – mixing location
 Sixteenth Avenue Sound, Nashville, Tennessee – mixing location

References 

Out of the Grey albums
1994 albums
Sparrow Records albums